Andrew Fried (born February 10, 1976) is an American documentary filmmaker, producer and director, and the president of Boardwalk Pictures. Fried is known for producing documentary films and television series, such as Chef's Table, The Black Godfather, Last Chance U, 7 Days Out, My Love, Men in Kilts, Booktube, Street Food, Cheer, Val and The Goop Lab with Gwyneth Paltrow.  He directed the 2020 documentary film We Are Freestyle Love Supreme.

Early life 
Andrew Fried attended the Long Beach High School in New York.

Career 
Fried's earliest film work was in 2004, when he was an associate producer on Fade to Black, a documentary about the life and career of American rapper and record producer Jay-Z. Fried continued his career by producing the Sundance Channel series Iconoclasts, the 2006 documentary Black and White: A Portrait of Sean Combs, about American rapper Sean Combs, and the 2008 documentary Britney: For the Record for MTV.

Fried founded Boardwalk Pictures Inc., a Santa Monica-based production company, in 2010. The name of the company came from Fried's experiences growing up in Long Beach, New York. That same year, Fried directed and produced the 2010 documentary The Rocket Project, and produced The Oprah Winfrey Oscar Special, directed by Thomas Kail. From 2011 to 2015 Fried was the creative director of the Webby Awards, along with Kail. He produced the 2012 series The Conversation with Amanda de Cadenet.

Netflix, Chef's Table: 2015 - 2017 
Fried is one of the executive producers and directors of Chef's Table, which premiered in 2015 as Netflix's first original documentary series. During the process of filming the series, Fried and the other directors selected acclaimed chefs to be featured in the series. He directed the episodes featuring Niki Nakayama, Dominique Crenn, Nancy Silverton, Adeline Grattard, Christina Tosi and Bo Songvisava. Chef's Table has been nominated for three Emmy Awards. Fried also directed the 2016 spin-off Chef's Table: France.

On November 10, 2017, it was announced that Fried would produce the Starz-original documentary series In Fashion with Boardwalk Pictures, Rogue Atlas Productions and Lionsgate.

The Goop Lab, Cheer: 2018 - present 
In 2018, it was announced that Fried would be one of the executive producers of Lena Waithe's unscripted series You Ain't Got These, 7 Days Out, and the 2019 YouTube Original series BookTube.

The first season of 7 Days Out was released on December 21, 2018. The series documents the preparation for major events such as Chanel's Haute Couture Fashion Show and the Kentucky Derby in each episode.

Far From Home, a documentary about the lead up to the 2018 Winter Olympics in Pyeongchang, was executive produced by Fried for Olympic Channel. The series was filmed in 12 countries over a period of eight months, and was released February 5, 2018.Far From Home received the 2019 Venice TV Award in the Sport category.

Fried executive produced Action, a four-part documentary miniseries on the legalization of sports gambling. In May 2019, Chef's Table was renewed for a seventh and eighth season. The show was nominated for its third Emmy for "Outstanding Documentary or Nonfiction Series" in 2019.

Fried executive produced the 2020 Netflix documentary series Cheer, directed by Greg Whiteley. Cheer documented the lives of the Navarro College Bulldogs Cheer Team, and was praised for its portrayal of cheerleading, and for portraying the daily lives of its cast in a nuanced manner. The series was nominated for five Critics' Choice Real TV Awards and won two.

Fried directed We Are Freestyle Love Supreme, a documentary about the improv hip hop group Freestyle Love Supreme, which was produced by Lin-Manuel Miranda and Thomas Kail. We Are Freestyle Love Supreme was premiered at the 2020 Sundance Film Festival, and was released on Hulu on July 17, 2020.

He was executive producer of The Goop Lab, a Netflix series featuring Gwyneth Paltrow's Goop lifestyle company released 2020. On March 4, 2020, it was announced that Fried would executive produce Parenting Without Borders, a docuseries hosted by Jessica Alba. He executive produced the documentary series Home Game released June 26, 2020, and directed the episode "Highland Games".

Fried executive produced Street Food: Latin America which was released July 21, 2020. He also executive produced Last Chance U, which premiered its fifth and final season on July 28, 2020.

Fried is the director and executive producer of The One in November, a documentary about the 2020 Masters Tournament which aired on ESPN in 2021. He is also the executive producer of an untitled Bubba Wallace docuseries scheduled for release on Netflix in 2021.

Filmography

Films

Television

Awards and nominations 
Fried has received three Emmy nominations for the Netflix documentary series Chef's Table. On May 16, 2017, American chef Ivan Orkin presented Fried with the 21st Annual Webby Award for "Documentary: Series in Film & Video" for his work on Chef's Table. Fried also won for the James Beard Media Award for Best Television Program on Location.

References

External links 

 

1976 births
Living people
American documentary film directors
Long Beach High School (New York) alumni
People from Long Beach, New York
Primetime Emmy Award winners
American television producers
Television producers from New York (state)
Film producers from New York (state)
Film directors from New York (state)